Grandidiera is a monotypic genus of flowering plants belonging to the family Achariaceae. The only species is Grandidiera boivinii 

Its native range is in south-eastern Kenya, Tanzania and Mozambique.

Alfred Grandidier (1836–1921), a French naturalist and explorer.
The Latin specific epithet of boivinii refers to French explorer and plant collector Louis Hyacinthe Boivin (1808-1852).
It was first published and described in Bull. Soc. Bot. France Vol.13 on page 467 in 1866.

References

Achariaceae
Monotypic Malpighiales genera
Plants described in 1866
Garden plants
Flora of Kenya
Flora of Tanzania
Flora of Mozambique
Taxa named by Hippolyte François Jaubert